Pitcairnia carioana is a plant species in the genus Pitcairnia. This species is native to Mexico.

References

carioana
Flora of Mexico